Percnia longitermen is a species of moth of the family Geometridae first described by Louis Beethoven Prout in 1914. It is found in Taiwan.

References

Moths described in 1914
Ennominae